Morigaon (pron: mʌrɪˈgãʊ) is a town of  town area committee and the district headquarters of Morigaon district in the Indian state of Assam and including the headquarters of the Tiwa Autonomous Council (TAC), Tiwashong, Assam which was constituted by the Government of Assam on 14 April 1995, The Apex council will consist of 144 villages of Nagaon, Morigaon and Kamrup with 28 blocks. Pincode of Morigaon town is 782105.

Demographics
 India census, Morigaon had a population of 5,20,807. Males constitute 52% of the population and females 48%. Morigaon has an average literacy rate of 76%, higher than the national average of 59.5%: male literacy is 81%, and female literacy is 72%. In Morigaon, 12% of the population is under 6 years of age. The Keot (Kaibarta) community and the Tiwa (Lalung) community form the majority in this district.

Politics
Morigaon is part of Nowgong (Lok Sabha constituency).

Transport
National Highway 37 (India) and the Guwahati–Lumding section operated by Indian Railways' Northeast Frontier Railway pass through Jagiroad, 22 km away. Jagiroad is also connected with Morigaon by Morigaon Road.

Nearest railway stations to Morigaon are:

Major railway stations near Morigaon.

Banks

Morigaon town almost have all the major banks and ATM.
Banks and their branches:

Education

Morigaon town has many good colleges and schools.

Major colleges in Morigaon:

	 		

Major public schools in Morigaon

Other schools:

References

 
Cities and towns in Morigaon district